Pittsburgh Hardhats can refer to:

Pittsburgh Hardhats (softball) - a defunct professional softball team
Pittsburgh Hardhats (basketball) - a defunct professional basketball team